Number 1 is a 2020 Singaporean comedy-drama film written by Jaspers Lai and directed by Ong Kuo Sin. The film stars Mark Lee, Henry Thia, Kiwebaby Chang, Jaspers Lai, Kenneth Chia and Darius Tan. The film revolves around a retrenched middle-aged man who accidentally becomes a night club drag queen sensation.

The film was released on 22 October 2020 in Singapore and released on 10 February 2021 in Taiwan. It received two nominations at the 57th Golden Horse Awards, including Best Leading Actor for Mark Lee, and won Best Makeup and Costume Design.

Synopsis 
A middle-aged white-collar manager has been retrenched by his company. Struggles to find new jobs and support his family, he takes a job as a manager at a popular drag club called Number One. One day, he is forced to stand in as a cross dresser and performs on the stage. Surprisingly, he turns out to be so good and eventually becomes the biggest sensation at the night club. How will his funny story go?

Plot 
The film opens with Chee Beng (Mark Lee) performing at his company's annual New Year's Eve dinner. At the event, Chee Beng was handed his retrenchment letter by his superior. While they countdown to the new year at the event, his wife, Marie (Gina Tan), revealed to him that she was pregnant with their second child. As Chinese New Year approaches, Chee Beng was seen clearing out his desk. He starts searching for a job with the help of a recruitment agency, but to no avail. After multiple failed interviews, Chee Beng was given one last place to interview at while his recruitment agent advises him to sell his house and car for cash. He meets up with Fa Ge (Henry Thia), the owner of the nightclub, Number 1, for an interview. Chee Beng was hired without going through the interview and Fa Ge brings him to the nightclub. After taking up the role, Chee Beng realises that he was working at a drag queen nightclub and hides the fact from his family. The Queens Brotherhood, made up of Unicorn (Gadrick Chin), Tiny (Kenneth Chia), Italy (Darius Tan), Money (Jaspers Lai) and Pearl (Kiwebaby Chang) - are the 5 main performers at Number 1. It was revealed that Unicorn was a runaway soldier after he was arrested at the nightclub by military police officers. Chee Beng was asked to fill in for Unicorn, as Pearl would be unable to take center stage if they only had 4 people performing. Chee Beng reluctantly takes up the gig. When Chee Beng receives his appearance fee for his first performance, he decides to continue performing to pay off his housing and car loans.

Fa Ge introduces Chee Beng to the landlord of the nightclub, Teo Chew Phoenix (Cassandra See), where she makes Chee Beng consume glasses of hard liquor, resulting in Chee Beng passing out. The next day, Chee Beng wakes up in Pearl's house where he finds out why Pearl ended up working at the nightclub. Gradually, as Chee Beng interacted more with the other performers at the nightclub, he finds out more about the plights of the other performers and the stigma that they faced in society as drag performers. One night, while doing their usual performance, Fa Ge accidentally played the instrumental track and as the song starts playing, Pearl hesitates to sing live. Chee Beng begins singing and saves the performance. Marie is beginning to have suspicions about Chee Beng's unusual behaviours at home. After their first live performance, the audience at the nightclub demanded that the Queens Brotherhood sing live instead of lip syncing, which results in Pearl giving up the centre stage for Chee Beng to perform the Hokkien cover of 'I Will Survive'. After a live streamer, Happy Polla, was saved from choking by a viewer watching the Queens Brotherhood's performance online, the viewer announced that he was influenced by their performance of 'I Will Survive' to step forward. This resulted in the performance video going viral. Number 1 and its performers begins to gain more mainstream media coverage and Chee Beng oust Pearl as the highest paid performer at the nightclub.

Chee Beng had a fight with Pearl and the other performers backstage after a performance as Pearl was unhappy that Chee Beng took over his spot as center stage. After which, Teo Chew Phoenix exposed to his family that Chee Beng was performing at the nightclub in drag, which results in him quitting Number 1 and selling his house and car. As Chee Beng and the other performers made up, he went back to the nightclub to perform to raise funds for the elderly home. Marie and her sister Judy (Caryn Cheng) catch him performing again and as they argued, Marie goes into labour. Unable to get to a hospital in time, the Queens Brotherhood and Chee Beng helped with the delivery, resulting in Marie giving birth to a pair of boy-girl twins. The film ends with Chee Beng performing while his new twins and his family are in the audience.

Cast 
 Mark Lee as Chow Chee Beng
 Jaspers Lai as Money
 Kiwebaby Chang as Pearl
 Kenneth Chia as Tiny
 Darius Tan as Italy
 Henry Thia as Fa Ge
 Cassandra See as Teo Chew Phoenix
 Gina Tan as Marie
 Estovan Reizo Cheah as Mason
 Emily Ho as Jocelyn
 Gadrick Chin as Unicorn
 Caryn Cheng as Judy

Production, release 
Jaspers Lai contributes the original story and is one of the screenwriters. Mark Lee is the second Singaporean actor to be nominated in the Best Leading Actor category at Golden Horse Awards, after Gurmit Singh for Just Follow Law in 2007.

Accolades 
The film received two nominations at the 57th Golden Horse Awards. It won one award for Best Costume & Makeup Design.

Future 
The film ended with a teaser showing The Queens in a Thailand prison before a title card appears teasing a sequel titled "Number 2: Same Same But Different".

An IMDA brochure also confirms that a sequel is currently in development and production is believed to be set in Singapore and Thailand.

References

External links 

2020 films
Singaporean comedy-drama films
Drag (clothing)-related films
2020 comedy-drama films
Singaporean LGBT-related films
LGBT-related comedy-drama films
2020 LGBT-related films